Ericka Elizabeth Gracia Micolta (born 30 July 1989) is an Ecuadorian footballer who plays as a defender for Super Liga Femenina club CD El Nacional and the Ecuador women's national team.

International career
Gracia capped for Ecuador at senior level during the 2018 Copa América Femenina.

References

1989 births
Living people
Sportspeople from Esmeraldas, Ecuador
Ecuadorian women's footballers
Women's association football defenders
C.D. Cuenca Femenino players
Ecuador women's international footballers
21st-century Ecuadorian women